Teacher's Beau is a 1935 Our Gang short comedy film directed by Gus Meins.  It was the 136th Our Gang short (48th talking episode) that was released.

Plot
On the last day of school, the gang learns that their beloved teacher Miss Jones is getting married and that they'll have a new teacher in September, Mrs. Wilson. Miss Jones's fiancé Ralph playfully paints a frightening picture of Mrs. Wilson as "a dried-up, mean old woman," neglecting to inform the kids that his last name is Wilson and that Miss Jones will continue to be their teacher under her married name.

Thanks to Ralph's ill-timed joshing, the youngsters convince themselves that the only way to retain their favorite teacher is to break up the wedding, starting with the prenuptial reception, where the kids first attempt to write a sympathetic speech for Alfalfa to recite, but that ultimately fails when he loses his voice.  Next Spanky and Alfalfa disguise themselves as a rival "Man" to scare Ralph, however seeing through the obvious ruse foils it by giving Spanky a cigar that drops onto Alfalfa. Next Spanky and Buckweat surreptitiously spike the food by emptying the salt and pepper shakers into it and full bottles of tabasco sauce and horseradish. After they do this, they discover that "Mrs. Wilson" is actually Miss Jones and that Ralph, whose surname is Wilson, will let "her continue to teach [the class] as long as she'd like." Unfortunately, the gang must force themselves into eating the ultra-spicy spaghetti to save face. They all rush to the water spigot as soon as they are excused from the table.

Cast
 Matthew Beard as Stymie
 Scotty Beckett as Scotty
 George McFarland as Spanky
 Carl Switzer as Alfalfa
 Billie Thomas as Buckwheat
 Alvin Buckelew as Alvin
 Jerry Tucker  as Jerry
 Rex Downing as Our Gang member
 Pete The Pup as himself

Additional cast
 Harold Switzer as Harold
 The Cabin Kids as Themselves
 Dorothy Dandridge as Cabin Kid (stand-in)
 Jannie Hoskins as Cabin Kid (stand-in)
 Billy Bletcher as Chairman Of The Board
 Arletta Duncan as Miss Jones
 Gus Leonard as Old man
 Robert McKenzie as Laughing guest
 Edward Norris as Ralph Wilson
 Barry Downing as Classroom extra
 Marianne Edwards as Classroom extra
 Dorian Johnston as Classroom extra
 Margaret Kerry as Classroom extra
 Tommy McFarland as Classroom extra
 Donald Proffitt as Classroom extra
 Jackie White as Classroom extra
 Ernie Alexander as Guest
 Bobby Burns as Guest
 Charlie Hall as Guest
 Fred Holmes as Guest
 Lon Poff as Guest
 Beverley Baldey as Undetermined role
 Jamie Kauffman as Undetermined role
 Snooky Valentine as Undermined role

Other notes
Teacher's Beau marks the final appearance of series stalwart Matthew "Stymie" Beard and Jannie Hoskins. At one time the star of the series, Beard was reduced to a single line of dialogue in Teacher's Beau. Jannie was in Our Gang since the Silent Era. Dorothy Dandridge appears in this film.
The version included in the "Little Rascals" TV package had been severely edited back in 1971 for various reasons. It continued airing on AMC from 2001 to 2003 in its edited form, unlike other episodes. A complete and uncut version was available on VHS home video in the 1980s and 1990s. Like the other 79 talking Hal Roach-produced Our Gang episodes, this one was released on DVD as of October 28, 2008.
The rendition of Old MacDonald Had a Farm was sung by the Cabin Kids.  When they return to their seats, two members of the quintet were replaced by stand-ins, Dorothy Dandridge and Jannie Hoskins, a little sister of Allen Hoskins, who played Farina from 1922 to 1931.
The song Alfalfa sings, with his brother Harold accompanying on mandolin, is Ticklish Reuben.

See also
 Our Gang filmography

References

External links

1935 films
American black-and-white films
1935 comedy films
Films directed by Gus Meins
Hal Roach Studios short films
Films about educators
Our Gang films
1935 short films
1930s American films